Tonna melanostoma is a species of large sea snail, a marine gastropod mollusc in the family Tonnidae, the tun shells.

Distribution 
This species occurs off New Zealand

References

Tonnidae
Gastropods described in 1839